The Hal Russell Story is the final album by American avant-garde jazz composer, bandleader, and multi-instrumentalist Hal Russell recorded in Switzerland in 1992 and released on the ECM label in 1993.

Reception

The Allmusic review awarded the album 4 stars stating "It would be great if Hal Russell were still around serving up his wonderfully skewed jazz-rock, but this is as wonderful and fitting an epitaph as one could hope for".

The Down Beat review by Bill Shoemaker says that "Russell's circuitous route to Haldom is recounted here as a gloriously kaleidoscopic sound experience waxed just five weeks before his death."

Track listing
All compositions by Hal Russell except as indicated
 "Intro and Fanfare/Toy Parade/Trumpet March/Riverside Jump" – 5:22
 "Krupa" – 5:36
 "You're Blasé" (Ord Hamilton) – 1:51
 "Dark Rapture" (Benny Goodman, Manny Kurtz, Edgar Sampson) – 2:44
 "World Class" – 2:25
 "Wood Chips" – 2:31
 "My Little Grass Shack" (Bill Cogswell, Tommy Harrison, Johnny Noble) – 2:36
 "O & B" – 3:44
 "For M" – 6:17
 "Gloomy Sunday" (Rezső Seress) – 2:31
 "Hair Male" – 3:13
 "Bossa G" – 0:38
 "Mildred" – 1:07
 "Dope Music" – 1:44
 "The 2 x 2" – 3:13
 "The Ayler Songs" – 5:53
 "Rehcabnettul" – 4:05
 "Steve's Freedom Principle" – 5:33
 "Lady in the Lake" (Kent Kessler) – 3:31
 "Oh Well" (Peter Green) – 2:39

Personnel
Hal Russell – tenor saxophone, soprano saxophone, trumpet, xylophone, drums, percussion, gong, narrator, vocals
Mars Williams – tenor saxophone, alto saxophone, bass saxophone, toy horns, wood flute, didgeridoo, bells, sounds, narrator
Brian Sandstrom – bass, trumpet, electric guitar, toy horns, percussion
Kent Kessler – bass, trombone
Steve Hunt – drums, vibraphone, timpani, percussion

References

ECM Records albums
Hal Russell albums
1993 albums
NRG Ensemble albums